Regina Stegemann (born 1951 in Göttingen) is an organ builder from East Frisia who specialises in the restoration of historic organs, but also carries out maintenance and rebuilding work. New builds are carried out exclusively with mechanical slider chests. Her area of work is concentrated on East Frisia, the Oldenburg Land and the Wesermarsch.

She learned organ building in the 1970s at the  company (Kassel) and Rudolf Janke and was a journeywoman with Gerald Woehl until 1984 (Marburg), with whom she also took the master craftsman's examination (1990). From 1985 to 1991, she led the "Krummhörner Orgelwerkstatt" in Greetsiel, a collective of young organ builders (Bartelt Immer, Hero Bödeker, Martin and Wilfried Fooken).

Jürgen Kopp joined Stegemann in 1987 from Jürgen Ahrend for a few years before becoming a self-employed professional. After passing his master craftsman's examination in 1995, he worked in their workshop from 1996 to 2000, specialising, among other things, in the construction of chest organs. In 2000, Kopp took over the entire business in Tannenhausen. Stegemann continued to use the workshop for her own organ building projects and was a temporary employee in his business until Koop's death in June 2014.

Work (selection)

References

Further reading 
 
 

 

German pipe organ builders
1951 births
Living people
20th-century German businesswomen
20th-century German businesspeople
Businesspeople from Göttingen
21st-century German businesswomen
21st-century German businesspeople